Siam Square is a shopping and entertainment area in the Siam area of Bangkok, Thailand. The square is located at the corner of Phayathai Road and Rama I Road and is owned by Chulalongkorn University, managed by its Property Management Office, known as "Chula Property". It is connected to nearby shopping centers and shopping districts, such as MBK Center, Siam Paragon, and Ratchaprasong shopping district, by a skywalk.

History 
The area of Siam Square, which belongs to Chulalongkorn University, was originally full of wooden houses and slum areas, until a fire incident evacuated the villagers from the area. After the fire, General Prapas Charusatien director of Chulalongkorn University at that time, decided to develop the area of Siam Square into a commercial place in order to prevent the slum community that originally resided there from returning. The Southeast Asia Company was the first to develop this area as an open-air shopping mall. The first building was constructed in 1962 and finished in 1963, with Associated Professor Lert Urasayanan as the architect and Professor Rachot Kanchanawanit as the engineer.

The original name of the square was Pathum Wan Square, because it is in Pathum Wan District. However, Kobchai Sosothikul, founder of Seacon Development Co. and owner of the project at that time, felt that the name was too small and renamed it to Siam Square after the whole country, Siam being the old name of Thailand.

Later in 1991, various tutoring schools began opening in the Siam Square area, targeting students from the many schools nearby. 

Siam Square entered a period of downturn In 1996, when the Thai economy was in a state of recession from IMF debt. The nearby construction of the BTS Skytrain at that time also caused traffic jams that drove customers to other shopping districts. To combat this issue, Chulalongkorn University initiated a project of turning Siam Square into a center of technology and development, with many improvements to the area in 1999 and 2000. One such development was relocating the parking lot behind the Lido cinema to the Witthayakit Building, opening up the space for outside companies to invest in developing the area, which became known as "Center Point" and served as a center of recreation for teenagers.

Present day 
Siam Square is maintained by the University Property Management Office of Chulalongkorn University. It has been compared to a "one-tenth miniature" of Bangkok in terms of catering for diverse needs, with over 4,200 shops in many styles and also many other types of services including many successful Thai businesses, tutor schools, restaurants, cafes, fashion, art, design, and many new emerging businesses. 

The customers or visitors vary from young-aged school and college students to office workers and foreign tourists, although most are students coming to attend the tutoring institutions concentrated in the area: at least 30 schools are located here, making Siam Square the number one tutoring center in the country.

Siam Square is a popular destination and traffic hub, with at least 400,000 people traveling to and through Siam Square each day..

Location 
The area is located at the corner of Phayathai Road and Rama I Road, prominently in front of Siam BTS station, which can be considered as the center of Bangkok.

Transportation 
Due to its location in the heart of Bangkok, many means of transportation are available.

BTS stations 
Aside from Siam station, Siam Square is close to National Stadium BTS station and Chit Lom BTS station.

Bus 
There are several bus lines that pass through Siam Square, with five soi having bus stops.

Skywalk 
A skywalk Begins at National Stadium BTS station, passing by Siam BTS station and connecting to Chit Lom BTS station. It connects to various shopping malls; all of the following can be reached by skywalk:

Siam Square One (In the Siam Square area.)
Center Point Siam (In the Siam Square area.)
Siamkit (In the Siam Square area.)
Siam Paragon
Siam Center
Siam Discovery
MBK Center
Central World
Gaysorn Village
Amarin
The Market Bangkok
Central Chidlom
Central Embassy

Popular attractions 
Siam Square is a composite of many different entertainment options. From Cinemas, bowling alleys to aquarium and museum. This area has it all, due to the advantage of being connected to many other popular places that can easily be reached with a skywalk. Siam Square is like the center of shopping and entertainment in Thailand.
These are some of the most popular attractions.

Scala Cinema 
The 1,000-seat Scala Cinema movie theater first opened in Siam Square in 1969, and was considered one of the finest movie houses in Asia. It was demolished in 2021 by the landowner, Chulalongkorn University, to make way for re-development.

SEA LIFE Bangkok Ocean World (Siam Paragon) 
One of the largest aquariums in Southeast Asia. With the size of 3 Olympic pools and over 30,000 marine animals from across the world.

Pathum Wanaram Temple 
The temple was built by King Rama IV in 1857 as a place of worship. This place is a rare example of ancient craftsmanship featuring ornate stencils and lacquered sculptures.

Madame Tussauds (Siam Discovery Center) 
A wax museum with 10 exhibit rooms of lifelike wax figures. All in real-life themes, this made the museum feels more like a journey in time.

Bangkok Art and Culture Centre (BACC) 
An art center with the widest range of contemporary art, design, music, theatre, and film in Bangkok. It regularly hosts changing exhibitions from both Thai and International artists.

Cinemas

Lido Connect – often runs independent films not screened elsewhere in Bangkok. Concerts and other events are occasionally held here. 

A 1970s-era single-screen cinema called the Siam, along with its surrounding arcades, burnt down during the 2010 Thai military crackdown and the site is now replaced with Siam Square One Shopping Center.

See also
 List of shopping malls in Thailand
 Siam Center

References

External links

Siam Square guide

Shopping districts and streets in Bangkok
Property Management of Chulalongkorn University
Thai youth culture
Pathum Wan district